Douthitt Strip  is a privately owned, private use airport located one nautical mile (2 km) east of the central business district of El Centro, a city in Imperial County, California, United States.

History
It provided contract glider training to the United States Army Air Forces from 1942 to 1944. Training was provided by Aeronautical Training Center, Inc. It used primarily C-47 Skytrains and Waco CG-4 unpowered gliders. The mission of the school was to train glider pilot students in proficiency in operation of gliders in various types of towed and soaring flight, both day and night, and in servicing gliders in the field.

Facilities and aircraft 
Douthitt Strip has two runways with dirt surfaces: 4/22 is 1,800 by 100 feet (549 x 30 m) and 8/26 is 1,400 by 100 feet (427 x 30 m). There are 23 aircraft based at this airport: 91% single-engine and 9% ultralight.

See also 

 California World War II Army Airfields

References

Other sources 
 
 Manning, Thomas A. (2005), History of Air Education and Training Command, 1942–2002.  Office of History and Research, Headquarters, AETC, Randolph AFB, Texas 
 Shaw, Frederick J. (2004), Locating Air Force Base Sites, History’s Legacy, Air Force History and Museums Program, United States Air Force, Washington DC.

External links 
 Aerial image as of May 2002 from USGS The National Map
 

Airports in Imperial County, California
Airfields of the United States Army Air Forces in California
USAAF Contract Flying School Airfields
USAAF Glider Training Airfields
1942 establishments in California
Airports established in 1942